Kim Kwan-jin (born August 27, 1949) is Chief of The National Security Office in South Korea, following his appointment in the year of 2014. He was previously the 33rd Chairman of the Joint Chiefs of Staff of the South Korean armed forces and the Minister of National Defense.

Education
 Graduated, Seoul High School
 Bachelor of Science, Korea Military Academy (28th Graduating Class)

Career
Kim previously served as Commanding General, 35th Infantry Division (1999–2000), Commanding General, II Corps (2002–2004), and Chief Director, Joint Operations Headquarters, Joint Chiefs of Staff (2004–2005). He was promoted to four-star general and assumed command of Third ROK Army in 2005. In 2006, he became the 33rd Chairman of the Joint Chiefs of Staff, replacing General Lee Sang-hee.

On March 28, 2008, he was replaced by General Kim Tae-young. Following incidents of the bombardment of Yeonpyeong, he was selected to replace Kim Tae-young as a new National Defense Minister of the Republic of Korea on November 26, 2010.

After the end of President Lee Myung-bak's term in office in February 2013, incoming President Park Geun-hye decided to retain Kim in his post of Defense Minister after Park's nominee Kim Byung-kwan was forced to resign under pressure over a series of alleged ethical lapses and North Korea's repeated war threats.

References

External links

 [ Republic of Korea Joint Chiefs of Staff]

South Korean generals
Government ministers of South Korea
Living people
1949 births
Korea Military Academy alumni
Chairmen of the Joint Chiefs of Staff (South Korea)
National Defense ministers of South Korea